Germans of Spanish descent is any citizen or resident of Germany who is of Spanish ancestral origin. Between 1960-1973 up to 600,000 Spaniards emigrated to Germany.

Notable people
List of Spaniards in Germany:
Mario Gomez, Heinz-Harald Frentzen, Gonzalo Castro, Francisco Copado, Curro Torres, Enrique Sánchez Lansch, Marc Gallego, Stefan Ortega, Joselu, Daniel Brühl, Aarón (footballer), Oscar Corrochano, Stephanie zu Guttenberg, Alberto Mendez, Vanessa Petruo, Alexandra Sanchez, Santiago Ziesmer, Sercan Sararer, Marcos Alvarez, Marcel Titsch-Rivero, Gabi Delgado-López, Miguel Castillo Muñoz.

Spaniards in Germany per Bundesland (1980 to 2020)

Spaniards in Germany per County (Kreise) (2001 to 2020)

Population over time

References 

Germany
Ethnic groups in Germany
 
Spanish diaspora in Europe